Platypterygius is a historically paraphyletic genus of platypterygiine ichthyosaur from the Cretaceous period. It was historically used as a wastebasket taxon, and most species within Platypterygius likely are undiagnostic at the genus or species level, or represent distinct genera, even being argued as invalid. While fossils referred to Platypterygius have been found throughout different continents, the holotype specimen was found in Germany.

Description 

As Platypterygius contains multiple species not especially close to each other, little can be said in terms of shared characteristics. According to an analysis by Fischer (2012), all anatomical features used to unify Platypterygius species are either not actually present in each species, or much more widespread among unrelated ophthalmosaurs. Generally, species referred to this genus were large bodied macropredators based on their robust dentition. This is also supported by P. australis having been found with remains of sea turtles and birds (specifically, of the genus Nanantius) in its guts, as well as an unidentified pterosaur fossil with tooth marks that may be from this genus. 

Discovery and species 

The type species of Platypterygius was described in 1922 based on remains found in upper Aptian strata around Hannover, Germany. These remains however were not adequately described and to complicate matters further, destroyed during World War 2. In the time after its discovery however Platypterygius has become a catch-all genus for Cretaceous ichthyosaurs, creating the misconstrued view of post-Jurassic ichthyosaurs as being a single global genus lacking in diversity. Later research conducted in the 2000s and 2010s has repeatedly shown this to be false, with all of the autapomorphies previously used to define Platypterygius either not being present in all assigned species or also being present in other ophthalmosaurids. As the holotype was destroyed, a redescription of the material attempting to identify valid autapomorphies is out of the question and leaves the genus in a problematic state. Furthermore, the inclusion of later described genera of Cretaceous, platypterygiine ichthyosaurs has shown Platypterygius to be paraphyletic, with the different species not clading closely to one another. Subsequently, many redescriptions of referred Platypterygius species have found them to be their own distinct genera.

One notable attempt at revising Platypterygius was conducted by  Arkhangel'sky in 1998, who split the genus into 3 new subgenera. Longirostria (including the Australian "P." longmani, a synonym of "P." australis, and the Argentinian "P." hautali), Tenuirostria ("P." americanus) and Pervushovisaurus (which included the newly described "P." bannovkensis). Both Platypterygius platydactylus,"P." kiprianoffi and "P." hercynicus were placed in the subgenus Platypterygius.

"Platypterygius" bannovkensis was eventually elevated to its own genus Pervushovisaurus in 2014, utilizing Arkhangel'sky's proposed subgenus name and "P." campylodon was also assigned to this genus by a study published in 2016. "P." kiprianoffi was also assigned to P. campylodon (now Pervushovisaurus). Simbirskiasaurus was originally described in 1985 and later sunk into Platypterygius before being declared distinct in the same paper as Pervushovisaurus. "Platypterygius" ochevi, described in 2008 by Arkhangel'sky et al., was found to be a junior synonym of Maiaspondylus cantabrigiensis and in 2021 "Platypterygius" sachicarum was described by Cortés et al. as Kyhytysuka sachicarum. It is argued that the inclusion of oldest species "P." hauthali requires reinvestigation, for it lacks a skull to attribute. Because of this, recent analyses on ichthyosaur classification neglect this species.

Accepted species 

 Platypterygius platydactylus  
 Platypterygius americanus  (=Tenuirostria)
 Platypterygius australis  (=Longirostria)
 Platypterygius hercynicus

Formerly assigned species 
 Pervushovisaurus bannovkensis 
 Pervushovisaurus campylodon 
 Simbirskiasaurus birjukovi 
 Plutoniosaurus bedengensis 
 Maiaspondylus cantabrigiensis (senior synonym of Platypterygius ochevi )
 Kyhytysuka sachicarum  (formerly Platypterygius sachicarum )

Classification 
The following cladogram shows the internal relationships of ophthalmosaurian ichthyosaurs according to an analysis performed by Zverkov and Jacobs (2020) which shows that P. americanus is too distantly related compared to the other three species.

See also 
 List of ichthyosaurs
 Timeline of ichthyosaur research

References

Bibliography

Further reading 
 Long, J.A., Dinosaurs of Australia and New Zealand, UNSW Press, Australia 1998

External links 
 Dann's Dinosaurs
 Platypterygius

Ichthyosauromorph genera
Early Cretaceous ichthyosaurs
Late Cretaceous ichthyosaurs
Hauterivian genus first appearances
Barremian life
Aptian life
Albian life
Cenomanian genus extinctions
Cretaceous reptiles of Asia
Cretaceous Russia
Fossils of Russia
Cretaceous reptiles of Australia
Fossils of Australia
Fossils of New Zealand
Cretaceous reptiles of Europe
Cretaceous France
Fossils of France
Cretaceous Germany
Fossils of Germany
Mesozoic Switzerland
Fossils of Switzerland
Cretaceous United Kingdom
Fossils of England
Cretaceous reptiles of North America
Cretaceous Canada
Fossils of Canada
Cretaceous United States
Fossils of the United States
Early Cretaceous reptiles of South America
Cretaceous Argentina
Fossils of Argentina
Cretaceous Chile
Fossils of Chile
Cretaceous Colombia
Fossils of Colombia
Altiplano Cundiboyacense
Paja Formation
Cretaceous Venezuela
Fossils of Venezuela
Fossil taxa described in 1922
Taxa named by Friedrich von Huene
Ophthalmosauridae